Scratch My Back is an album by saxophonist David "Fathead" Newman recorded in 1979 and released on the Prestige label.

Track listing 
All compositions by Jay Fleecewood, Tanyette Willoughby and David "Fathead" Newman except where noted
 "One Step at a Time" – 5:51
 "You Gotta Keep Gotta Keep Dancin'" – 6:34
 "Two Can Do It" – 6:25
 "Scratch My Back" (Kevin Toney) – 5:52
 "Rock Me, Baby (Like My Back Ain't Got No Bone)" (Toney, Bessie Scott) – 5:34
 "After the Ball" (Fleecewood, Newman) – 3:40
 "The Buggs" (Claude Johnson) – 3:29

Personnel 
David "Fathead" Newman – tenor saxophone, alto saxophone, soprano saxophone, flute
Kevin Toney – electric piano, clavinet, synthesizers
Richard Tee – piano (tracks 3-7)
Cornell Dupree (tracks 3-7), Eric Gale (tracks 1 & 2) – guitar
Ron Carter - bass (tracks 1-3, 6 & 7)
Wilbur Bascomb – bass guitar (tracks 3-5) 
Harvey Mason – drums
Bill Summers – congas, percussion
Tanyette (tracks 1-3), Bessie Ruth Scott (track 5) – lead vocals
Randy Brecker, Jon Faddis – trumpet (tracks 1, 2, 4. 5 & 7)
Earl McIntyre – trombone (tracks 1, 2, 4. 5 & 7)
Jerry Dodgion, Kenneth Harris, George Marge – flute (tracks 1-5 & 7)
James Buffington - French horn (track 3)
String section: (tracks 1-6)
Gerald Tarak – concertmaster, violin
Anahid Ajemian, Frederick Buldrini, Harold Kohon, Joseph Malignaggi, Anthony Posk, Charles Veal, Marylin Wright – violin
Julian Barber, Alfred Brown – viola
Jesse Levy, Kermit Moore – cello
Flame Braithwaite (tracks 2, 4 & 5), Ben Carter (track 5), Deborah McGriff (tracks 2, 4 & 5) – backing vocals
William Fischer – arranger, conductor

References 

David "Fathead" Newman albums
1979 albums
Prestige Records albums
Albums produced by Orrin Keepnews
Albums arranged by William S. Fischer
Albums conducted by William S. Fischer